Barbara Gervin Hawkins (born April 3, 1954) is an American politician. She is a Democratic member of the Texas House of Representatives, representing the 120th District. She defeated incumbent Laura Thompson, an independent, in the November 2016 general election.

Biography
Gervin-Hawkins was raised in Michigan by a single mother of six. She graduated from Eastern Michigan University in 1975 with a degree in accounting. Her first job was at the Ford Motor Company. She moved to San Antonio, Texas, after her brother, professional basketball player George Gervin, who played for the NBA's San Antonio Spurs, hired her as his personal accountant. In 1991, the siblings founded the George Gervin Youth Center in San Antonio.

References

External links
 State legislative page

Living people
Democratic Party members of the Texas House of Representatives
21st-century American politicians
Eastern Michigan University alumni
Women state legislators in Texas
21st-century American women politicians
1954 births